Damascus High School (DHS) is a public high school in Damascus, Maryland, United States. It is part of the Montgomery County Public Schools district.

History 
Damascus High School was built in 1950 and renovated in 1978.

Athletics 
The Damascus football team won the Maryland 3A state title in 2015, 2016, 2017, 2019, and 2022 a run that included a state record 53-game winning streak. Damascus also won a 3A title in 2007 and 4A titles in 2003 and 2005. Damascus won four previous state football championships in 1981, 1992, 1993 and 1996.

In 2019, the football program came under scrutiny, after it was discovered that four players on the team were raped by teammates that were recent transfers from nearby Clarksburg High School with broomsticks.  The school's administration waited 12 hours after learning about the rapes before contacting the police.  The team members who were accused were initially tried as adults before having their cases moved to juvenile court.  As a result, the students were found guilty but later released on bond..

Notable alumni 
 Joel Ross, CFL player
 Brian Stelter, political commentator
 Kevin Thompson, NFL player
Bryan Bresee, college athlete
Jake Funk, NFL player and Super Bowl LVI champion
Joe Tippett, actor

References 
 The best person to come out of Damascus.   All around good guy.

External links 
 

Public high schools in Montgomery County, Maryland